Spatial variability occurs when a quantity that is measured at different spatial locations exhibits values that differ across the locations.  Spatial variability can be assessed using spatial descriptive statistics such as the range.

Let us suppose that the Rev' z(x) is perfectly known at any point x within the field under study. Then the uncertainty about z(x) is reduced to zero, whereas its spatial variability still exists. Uncertainty is closely related to the amount of spatial variability, but it is also strongly dependent upon sampling.

Geostatistical analyses have been strictly performed to study the spatial variability of pesticide sorption and degradation in the field. Webster and Oliver provided a description of geostatistical techniques. Describing uncertainty using geostatistics is not an activity exempt from uncertainty itself as variogram uncertainty may be large and spatial interpolation may be undertaken using different techniques.

References

Literature 

 Isaaks, E.H., Srivastava R.M.: Applied Geostatistics. 1989
 Fortin, Marie-Josee, Dale, Mark.: Spatial Analysis A Guide for Ecologists. 2005. Cambridge University Press, 365 pp.
 
 * * *

External links 

 
http://gis.esri.com/library/userconf/proc05/papers/pap1184.pdf
https://web.archive.org/web/20100110102738/http://willingtoncropservices.co.uk/case_study_GPS-soil-sampling-nutrient-mapping.htm Willington Crop Services shows spatial variability in action with Case Study on GPS soil sampling, GPS nutrient mapping and nutrient management.

Spatial analysis